Wheelertown is a hamlet located on Wheelertown Road in the town of Russia in Herkimer County, New York, United States. Little Black Creek flows east through the hamlet.

References

Hamlets in Herkimer County, New York
Hamlets in New York (state)